Tadeusz Świątek (born 8 November 1961) is a Polish footballer. He played in Polish football clubs such as Wisła Płock, Widzew Łódź, Polonia Warsaw and Hutnik Warszawa. He also played at Yukong Elephants in South Korea.

He was one of the first Polish players of K League, along with Leszek Iwanicki.

Honours
 Widzew Łódź
 Polish Cup Winners : 1985
 Yukong Elephants  
 K League Winners : 1989
 K League Best XI : 1991

References

External links
 
 

1961 births
Living people
Association football midfielders
Polish footballers
Poland youth international footballers
Polish expatriate footballers
Wisła Płock players
Widzew Łódź players
Jeju United FC players
Polonia Warsaw players
Ekstraklasa players
K League 1 players
Expatriate footballers in South Korea
People from Świdnica
Sportspeople from Lower Silesian Voivodeship
Association football forwards
Poland international footballers